The Schlossbergbahn is a funicular railway in the town of Freiburg im Breisgau in Baden-Württemberg, Germany. It links the city centre with the Schlossberg hill.

The funicular was constructed in 2008, in order to replace a previous cable car that was used between 1968 and 2006. It is operated by the  Schlossbergbahn GmbH & Co. KG. The line operates daily between 09:00 and 22:00 (18:00 on Tuesdays), and is accessible to wheelchairs.

The funicular has the following technical parameters:

See also 
 List of funicular railways

References

External links 

Schlossbergbahn web site

Railway lines in Baden-Württemberg
Transport in Freiburg im Breisgau
Funicular railways in Germany
1200 mm gauge railways in Germany
Tourist attractions in Freiburg im Breisgau
Railway lines opened in 2008